Francis Kelly (28 December 1938 – 28 February 2016) was an Irish actor, singer and writer, whose career covered television, radio, theatre, music, screenwriting and film. He is best remembered for playing Father Jack Hackett in the Channel 4 sitcom Father Ted.

Early life and career
Kelly was born, in 1938, in Blackrock, south County Dublin, where he lived most of his life. His parents were Kathleen and Charles E. Kelly, cartoonist and founder of the satirical magazine Dublin Opinion. He was educated at Blackrock College and went on to study law at University College Dublin and tried journalism, working for years as a subeditor at Irish newspapers, before moving on to acting. He worked at Dublin's Eblana Theatre with Cecil Sheridan and as a feed to Jack Cruise. Other work included pantomime and reviews.

Kelly's first film role, which was uncredited, was as a prison officer in The Italian Job (1969), escorting Charlie Croker (Michael Caine) out of prison in the film's opening sequence.

He starred in the popular RTÉ children's programme Wanderly Wagon alongside Eugene Lambert and Nora O'Mahoney from 1968 to 1982, playing a number of different characters and writing many of the scripts. It was Kelly's work on Hall's Pictorial Weekly (1970–1982) that established him as one of Ireland's most recognisable faces. He memorably portrayed councillor Parnell Mooney, a send-up of a backward local authority figure in rural Ireland. In 1974, Kelly won a Jacob's Award for his work on the series.

In the early 1980s, he was featured in the RTÉ television programme for those learning Irish Anois is Aris. At the end of the programme he spoke into a telephone, gradually introducing Irish phrases. In 1988, he appeared in the Irish thriller film Taffin.

Father Ted
Kelly was best known outside Ireland for playing Father Jack Hackett in the comedy series Father Ted, which aired in the United Kingdom from April 1995 to May 1998. Father Jack is an old, alcoholic and offensively rambunctious priest who usually shouts only "feck!", "arse!", "drink!" and "girls!" and the occasional scream of "what!" and "women's knickers".

For his role in Father Ted, he wore contact lenses (to show Father Jack's cataract). People would not eat lunch with him during filming if he was in his Father Jack make-up because the false flaky skin he was wearing would fall off into the food.

Interviewing Kelly in 1997 for The Irish Times, Deirdre Falvey said of him: "In person he could not be further from Father Jack. Urbane, articulate, thoughtful, fit (he swims and hikes), charming company, full of stories, and quite serious, though his conversation is punctuated by the occasional burst of laughter—he is reputably a great slagger with colleagues, and is very well liked." Kelly himself said:
I like humour—but I'm very suspicious of people who laugh all the time, because they never listen to what you're saying, they always—have another agenda and they generally have no sense of humour. The most untrustworthy body language I know is that of the person who laughs all the time. That terrifies me. People with no sense or a very limited sense of humour I am very wary of too, because it's not a sign of great intelligence to be without a sense of humour. If you've no sense of irony you haven't a great decision making capacity because you must see the possibilities of the downside of any decision. Without perspective you can't have any wisdom, so it frightens me when I meet captains of industry or whatever who have virtually no sense of humour. That's the kind of person I find dismaying.

Later career
From 1999 to 2001, Kelly starred in Glenroe as Maurice and played Henry Doyle (father of Pierce Brosnan's Desmond Doyle) in Evelyn (2002). He appeared in the film Rat in 2000, as a priest called Father Pickle in the TV series Lexx (2001), and also in a short film, Yu Ming Is Ainm Dom, in 2003. That same year, he had a major role as John Smith, leader of the Labour Party, in the UK Television drama The Deal.

In 2007, he acted in the TG4 political drama Running Mate, about an election campaign. He also appeared in the TG4 series Paddywhackery.

On 29 September 2010, it was announced that Kelly had joined ITV1 soap Emmerdale, playing the role of Dermot, Declan Macey's father. Kelly left the soap after five months of filming because he missed his family in Ireland.

A regular stage actor, Kelly toured extensively in the United States and Canada. He provided voice-overs and in his television advertising work, appeared with "Mr Tayto" in an advertising campaign for Tayto crisps.

In 2014, he appeared as judge Justice Cannon in Mrs. Brown's Boys D'Movie.

In September 2015, Kelly published an autobiography called The Next Gig. His reminiscences include those of acting colleagues including Pierce Brosnan and Michael Caine.

Radio comedy
Many of his radio sketches originated from his weekday RTÉ radio show The Glen Abbey Show in the 1970s until the 1990s. Kelly played the part of a culchie, "Gobnait O'Lúnasa", the sketches typically started with the sound of him putting coins in an old freckle coin box, and when the phone rang and was answered, his words were, "Hello! Guess who? Is that you Nuala?" Kelly acted the part of an English BBC reporter interviewing rural inhabitants about local customs, such as watching bacon being sliced, or "ha-hooing" (shouting a rebel yell) competitions. The village was called Ballykilferret and described by the BBC man as being in "the Republic of Eer-ah" (a mispronunciation of Éire).

Music career
In 1982, Kelly released a single, "Christmas Countdown", a comedy monologue  based on the Christmas song "The Twelve Days of Christmas" and credited to the  pseudonymic Gobnait O’Lúnasa. It reached number eight in the Irish Singles Chart in 1982, and peaked at number 26 in the UK Singles Chart and number 15 in Australia in 1984. 
He performed the single live on Top of the Pops on 5 January of that year. The single was the opening track on the later album Comedy Countdown.

In 2000 he released Comedy Countdown, an album featuring some of his sketches taken from The Glen Abbey Show. Tracks included the "Ayatollah Ceili Band" (a pun on The Tulla Céilí Band), "Magnum Farce", "Incoming Call", "Festive Spirit", "Hymn of Praise", "Call of the Wild", "Festive Note" and "Siege Mentality".

Death
Kelly died on 28 February 2016, after suffering a heart attack. He revealed he had Parkinson's disease in October 2015, and was recovering from bowel cancer. He had previously survived skin cancer.

His death came exactly 18 years after the death of his Father Ted co-star Dermot Morgan. Speaking at Kelly's funeral, Michael D. Higgins, the President of Ireland, said, "He will forever be remembered for his roles in the theatre and will be recalled with great affection and fondness for his roles on television, including in Wanderly Wagon, Glenroe and the much-loved Hall's Pictorial Weekly."

Kelly and Bairbre, his wife of 51 years who was a drama teacher, had five daughters and two sons.

Filmography

Film

Television

Short film

Books
2015, The Next Gig, Dublin: Currach Press,

References

External links
 

1938 births
2016 deaths
20th-century Irish male actors
21st-century Irish male actors
Alumni of University College Dublin
Father Ted
Irish male film actors
Irish male comedians
Irish male radio actors
Irish satirists
Irish male soap opera actors
Irish male stage actors
Irish male television actors
Male actors from Dublin (city)
Jacob's Award winners
People educated at Blackrock College
People from Blackrock, Dublin
People with Parkinson's disease
Irish expatriates in England